Galaxy Records was a record label founded in 1964 by Max and Sol Weiss in Berkeley, California. It was a division of Fantasy Records.

History

Galaxy Records was officially launched in 1964 in Berkeley, California.  In 1967 Galaxy and Fantasy were sold. After ten years of inactivity, Galaxy released albums by Art Pepper, Chet Baker, Stanley Cowell, Nat Adderley, Tommy Flanagan, Red Garland, Johnny Griffin, Roy Haynes, Hank Jones, Philly Joe Jones, Shelly Manne, and Ira Sullivan.   Galaxy Records was closed down for good around 1990's due to conflict problems.

Discography
Galaxy Records first album series, the G-200/8200 series consisted of nine, primarily R&B, albums released between 1963 and 1968. In 1977 Galaxy started the GXY-5100 series, which was a jazz series that ran to 1985.

References

External links
Discography

1964 establishments in California
Re-established companies
Jazz record labels
Defunct record labels of the United States
Concord Music Group
Music of the San Francisco Bay Area